Matthew Scott Krentz (born August 5, 1976), also known as Matt Krentz, is an American director, producer and actor.

Krentz was born in St. Louis, Missouri. He graduated from Kansas City's Rockhurst University also spending several summers volunteering at Robert Redford's Sundance Summer Filmmakers' Lab.

His debut film directing was the short 15-minute The Call in 2002. He continued to produce Ponteuse in 2004. But his biggest success has been Streetballers, a film that tells the story of a friendship between two junior college basketball players, one African-American, one Irish-American, both trying to use streetball as their escape. Krentz plays the lead role, John Hogan, the white player befriending a black player named Jacob Whitmore played by Jimmy McKinney. He shot the film entirely in St. Louis, Missouri with an entirely local cast and crew. Krentz is from Webster Groves, one of the city's inner-ring suburbs.

Filmography

Director
 2002: The Call
 2009: Streetballers

Actor
 2002: The Call as best friend
 2009: Streetballers (2009) as John Hogan

Producer
 2004: Ponteuse
 2009: Streetballers

Writer
 2009: Streetballers

Editor
 2004: Ponteuse

Awards
 Won Jury Award – Honorable Mention for Best Feature Film at the Hollywood Black Film Festival for his film Streetballers(2008)
 Won Audience Choice Award Best Feature Film at the St. Louis International Film Festival for his Streetballers(2008)
 Also won Best Dramatic Feature prize at the same festival

References

External links
 
 Streeballers official site

American film directors
Film producers from Missouri
American male film actors
Living people
1976 births
Male actors from St. Louis